Can't Stop the Love is the sixth studio album and seventh overall album by  Bay Area-based R&B group Maze.  Released in 1985 on Capitol Records.

Track listing
All songs written by Frankie Beverly.

"Back in Stride"	7:02 	
"Can't Stop the Love" 	7:09 	
"Reachin' Down Inside" 	5:22 	
"Too Many Games" 	4:56 	
"I Want to Feel I'm Wanted" 	5:42 	
"Magic" 	4:51 	
"A Place in My Heart" 	4:50

Charts

Singles

See also
List of number-one R&B albums of 1985 (U.S.)

References

External links
 Maze Featuring Frankie Beverly -Can't Stop the Love at Discogs

1985 albums
Maze (band) albums
Capitol Records albums